The 2007 Nigerian Senate election in Taraba State was held on 21 April 2007, to elect members of the Nigerian Senate to represent Taraba State. Dahiru Bako representing Taraba Central, Joel Danlami Ikenya representing Taraba South and Anthony George Manzo representing Taraba North all won on the platform of the People's Democratic Party.

Overview

Summary

Results

Taraba Central 
The election was won by Dahiru Bako of the Peoples Democratic Party (Nigeria).

Taraba South 
The election was won by Joel Danlami Ikenya of the Peoples Democratic Party (Nigeria).

Taraba North
The election was won by Anthony George Manzo of the Peoples Democratic Party (Nigeria).

References 

April 2007 events in Nigeria
Tar
Taraba State Senate elections